David Faber (25 August 1928 – 28 July 2015) was a Polish Jew who survived nine concentration camps in occupied Poland and Nazi Germany. He was also an award-winning educator and lecturer on The Holocaust.

Life
He witnessed the murders of friends and family, the people they were staying with, and some of his extended family, at a dinner table by the Gestapo. He was sent to nine concentration camps in Germany and occupied Poland. Amazingly, he survived. At age 13, he was a fighter with Soviet partisans. Faber recalled seeing many horrible actions in the concentration camps, ranging from seeing a baby thrown into an oven to losing every friend he made in camp. Faber also recalled the horrors of seeing most of his family dead.

He remembered how an Italian friend named Finci ran into his father's arms and his father was shot right then (in front of him). When he was liberated from Bergen-Belsen in 1945, he was 18 years old and weighed 72 pounds. Faber said "I was a living skeleton". He said he could not resist anymore, and as soon as he was liberated he gave up on living. He was found at the side of a road and taken to a hospital.

After the war, Faber moved to England to live with his sister Rachel, the only other survivor of his immediate family, and worked as a pastry chef in London, including at the House of Commons. During that period, he married his first wife, Tonia, and had a son, Solomon. In the 1950s, he moved to the United States, working as a pastry chef in Springfield, Massachusetts, and being called to offer testimony against Nazi war criminals. He and his wife later moved to San Diego, California. After Tonia Faber's death, Faber remained in San Diego with his second wife, Lina.

Faber wrote his memoir, Because of Romek, in 1997, in memory of his older brother, who was murdered by Gestapo interrogators. Faber's book is required reading in some schools.

Faber died in San Diego on 28 July 2015, at the age of 86. He is buried in King David Lawn at Greenwood Memorial Park in San Diego.

Works

References

External links

1926 births
2015 deaths
20th-century Polish Jews
Bergen-Belsen concentration camp survivors
Burials at Greenwood Memorial Park (San Diego)